Chromatium is a genus of photoautotrophic Gram-negative bacteria which are found in water.  The cells are straight rod-shaped or slightly curved. They belong to the purple sulfur bacteria and oxidize sulfide to produce sulfur which is deposited in intracellular granules of the cytoplasm.

References

External links
Chromatium J.P. Euzéby: List of Prokaryotic names with Standing in Nomenclature

Chromatiales
Phototrophic bacteria
Bacteria genera